Dr. Francia  is a neighbourhood (barrio) of Asunción, Paraguay. The neighbourhood owes its name to the former Paraguayan consul and dictator José Gaspar Rodríguez de Francia.

Neighbourhoods of Asunción